Oswald George Powe (11 August 1926 - 9 September 2013), known as George Powe, was a Jamaican-born, England-based, radar operator, electrician, teacher, writer and racial-equality activist.

Powe served in the Royal Air Force during World War II, before moving to England. He led a successful campaign forcing Raleigh Bicycle Company to improve their treatment and recruitment of Black workers. He is the author of the 1956 publication Don’t Blame the Blacks. When he was elected as a  Labour Party local councillor, he became one of the first Black Labour councillors and the first Black Labour councillor in Greater Nottingham.

A blue plaque marks Powe's family home and a bus was named after him in 2022.

Early life 
Powe was born on 11 August 1926 in Spanish Town, Jamaica. His parents were, Richard Pow, a Chinese migrant to Jamaica, and Leonora Sinclair. They were shopkeepers.

Powe's father was Buddhist, his mother Catholic.

At the age of five he attended the Kingston Chinese school, thereafter St Ann's Elementary School in Kingston. Later he studied electrical engineering at Kingston Technical School before volunteering to join the Royal Air Force (RAF) in 1944, pretending to be older than 17 years of age.

Upon arrival in England his name was changed from Pow to Powe. His birth name was Oswald George Pow, and he had a Chinese name also, named after his father. Powe later formalised the name changes by deed poll.

Career 
Upon joining the RAF, Powe was posted to Scotland, and later relocated to Wiltshire where he was trained as a radar operator. The RAF subsequently posted him to Filey, Yorkshire, where he remained until he was demobilised in Jamaica, in 1948. On 2 October 1948, Powe travelled on the SS Orbita to Liverpool, and later got a job as an electrician’s mate in Birmingham. In 1969, he trained as a teacher before teaching mathematics at Robert Mellors School in Nottingham. He retired in 1983.

Politics and activism
In 1956, Powe campaigned for bike manufacturer Raleigh Bicycle Company to improve their recruitment policies for Black workers. His successful campaign, which included arranging the threat of a Jamaican trade embargo, resulted in Raleigh eventually becoming one of the major employers of Black people in Nottingham.

In 1956, Powe authored Don’t Blame the Blacks, a publication about the UK's complicated relationship with other Commonwealth countries. In the 1960s, he was a leader in the campaign against a local pub that refused to serve Black people. In 1964, Powe was a key part of a campaign to push Nottingham City Council to abolish their practice of channeling all labour complaints from Black workers though a specific welfare officer, rather than dealing directly with the complainants.

After initially joining the Communist Party, from 1963 to 1966 Powe was elected as the Labour Party local councillor for Long Eaton in Derbyshire. From 1989 to 1992 he was the Labour councillor for Nottinghamshire County Council, making him one of the first Black Labour councillors in the UK, and the first in Greater Nottingham.

In 1972, Powe was the chairman of a committee who successfully campaigned for better treatment of Pakistani workers at Nottingham textile company Crepe Sizes Ltd.

He was a key part of founding the African Caribbean National Artistic Centre, now one of the UK's oldest Black community centres. In 2011, Powe donated his documents to the Nottingham Black Archive.

Family life 
Powe had five children with Barbara Florence Pool, who he met in 1948, one of whom died at a young age. They separated in 1970 and divorced in 1977. He married Jill Westby in 1982.

Death and legacy 
Powe died at home on 9 September 2013, aged 87. His funeral was held in Mansfield Road Baptist Church and he was buried in Wilford Hill Cemetery, Nottingham.

Powe was a community elder and a founding member of the African Caribbean National Artistic Centre (ACNA Centre), one of the UK's oldest Black community centres.

In 2011, Powe donated a substantial number of historic documents to the Nottingham Black Archive, as well as being filmed for a documentary about the experiences of black servicemen who came to the UK following WW2.

In 2021, Powe's activism was the focus of the Don't Blame the Blacks exhibition at Nottingham Castle. A blue plaque was installed on the Powe family home in July 2022, and Nottingham City Transport named a bus after Powe in August 2022.

References

External links 

 Official website
 Don't Blame the Blacks, 1956 publication

1926 births
2013 deaths
British anti-racism activists
Migrants from British Jamaica to the United Kingdom
Royal Air Force personnel of World War II
People from Spanish Town
20th-century British writers
British schoolteachers
Politicians from Nottingham
Schoolteachers from Nottinghamshire